Devavarman (or Devadharman) was the 7th Emperor of the Maurya Empire. He ruled in the period 202–195 BCE. According to the Puranas, he was the successor of Shalishuka Maurya and reigned for a short period of seven years. He was not righteous, just, powerful and kind like his predecessor, Shalishuka. He was succeeded by Shatadhanvan.

Notes

Mauryan emperors 
3rd-century BC Indian monarchs
2nd-century BC Indian monarchs